Taraori, or Tarori or Tarawari, as it is sometimes called in the local dialect, is a town (Municipal committee) in Nilokheri Tehsil of Karnal district in the Indian state of Haryana. It is situated off NH-44, 14 km north of Karnal. The name Taraori is derived from the word Tarai.

History

It was at Tarawadi that in 1191 the Hindu Rajput army under Prithviraj Chauhan defeated the invading army of Muhammad of Ghaur at the First Battle of Tarain. The following year, Ghauri invaded again and defeated Prithviraj's forces here, at the Second Battle of Tarain. A wall around the fort is now in a dilapidated condition. A mosque and a tank, said to be the works of Aurangzeb, are still in existence. Taraori is also known as Tarain.

Demographics

 India census, Taraori had a population of 22,205. Males constitute 54% of the population and females 46%. Taraori has an average literacy rate of 62%, higher than the national average of 59.5%: male literacy is 66%, and female literacy is 56%. In Taraori, 15% of the population is under 6 years of age.

Most of the population works in agriculture, particularly in the production of basmati rice.

Economy
There are a large number of rice mills and few small-scale industries manufacturing dairy products, honey, soap, detergents, bajwa agri farm etc. Price quotes from Taraori Grain Market are published daily in many newspapers, such as Punjab Kesari.

Education
There are many schools/COLLEGES in the town, including:
 Saraswati Public School
Saraswati Public School (Pakhana)
 Pratap Public School
 S.M.S Memorial Public School
 Geeta Modern Senior Secondary School
 Geeta Vidya Mandir
 Narsingh Dass Public School
 SIRI GURU TEG BAHADUR PUBLIC SCHOOL & COLLEGE
 GOVT ITI
 MINERWA COLLEGE OF EDUCATION
 GOVT GIRLS COLLEGE
 HOLY CHILD AUXILIUM SCHOOL

Places to visit
Aside from its fort, Taraori has a gurdwara of Guru Teg Bahadur, the 9th Guru of the Sikhs, called  Shishganj Sahib Gurudwara.

Historical Shahi Jama Maszid of Mugal Period.

There is a Common Service Center (CSC Taraori) situated near Karnali Gate Parking.

There is a Design Agency *Adlab.Print* Specialized in Packaging & Advertisement Materials.

References

Cities and towns in Karnal district
Gurdwaras in Haryana
Forts in Haryana